Schneidermann, Schneiderman, or Shneiderman is a surname of Germanic origin, composed of "Schneider" ("tailor") and "Mann" ("person"/"man").

It may refer to:

 Davis Schneiderman (born 1974), American writer, academic, and higher-education administrator
 Eric Schneiderman (born 1954), American lawyer and politician; 65th Attorney General of New York
Harry Schneiderman (1885–1975), Polish-born American communal administrator and editor
 Rose Schneiderman (18821972), Polish-born American socialist and feminist
 Valerie Le Zimring-Schneiderman (born 1965), American Olympic rhythmic gymnast

Schneidermann 

 Daniel Schneidermann (born 1958), French journalist

Shneiderman 

 Ben Shneiderman (born 1947), American computer scientist and professor
 Nassi–Shneiderman diagram (NSD), in computer programming, a graphical design representation for structured programming

See also 

 Schneider (surname)

German-language surnames
Germanic-language surnames
Jewish surnames